The 2008–09 Belarusian Extraliga season was the 17th season of the Belarusian Extraliga, the top level of ice hockey in Belarus. 14 teams participated in the league, and HK Yunost Minsk won the championship.

Regular season

Playoffs
Quarterfinals
HK Yunost Minsk - Khimik-SKA Novopolotsk 3-0 on series
HK Khimvolokno Mogilev - HK Vitebsk 3-1 on series
HK Gomel - HK Neman Grodno 3-2 on series
Metallurg Zhlobin - HK Keramin Minsk 3-1 on series
Semifinals
HK Yunost Minsk - HK Khimvolokno Mogilev 3-2 on series
HK Gomel - Metallurg Zhlobin 3-0 on series
Final
HK Yunost Minsk - HK Gomel 4-3 on series

External links 
 Season on hockeyarchives.info

Belarusian Extraleague
Belarusian Extraleague seasons
Extra